William Elsey Connelley (1855-1930) was born in Johnson County, Kentucky. He was self-educated but he taught school in Johnson County between 1872 and 1880. He moved to Wyandotte County, Kansas, and lived in Bonner Springs, teaching until 1882. Connelley then moved on to other pursuits. He attended the Wyandotte County Normal Institute and received a teaching certificate. He worked for a time as a farmhand.

Connelley served a term as deputy county clerk and in 1883 was elected county clerk and served two terms, leaving office in 1887. He held a variety of jobs after that. In 1899 he was given the power of attorney to act in behalf of the Wyandotte Indian Tribe, then in Indian Territory, modern-day Oklahoma. He was to represent the tribe in the sale of Huron Cemetery. The land was to become a public building and the graves were to be moved. Objections were raised and the deal fell through.

The 1890s Connelley became interested in a hobby of historical research and writing. This is where he excelled and he completed a number of books the rest of his life. Some of his most important books were The Provisional Government of Nebraska Territory (1899), Quantrill and the Border Wars (1909), Eastern Kentucky Papers (1910), Life of Preston Plumb (1913), a five volume History of Kansas (1917), a five volume History of Kentucky (1922) and Indian Myths (1928).

Quantrill and the Border Wars has been used by historical researchers ever since and this book has been reprinted at least twice since Connelley's death. Connelley's books were full of details and included much material obtained in interviews with persons present at historical situations about which the author wrote. One criticism has been that at times Connelley failed to properly document where his material was obtained and sometimes this material could not be verified by later researchers.

Connelley's works became well known in the historical community and he became president of the Kansas State Historical Society in 1912 and its secretary in 1914. Connelley served as the Society's secretary the rest of his life. He continued his work and produced a number of maps of historical sites, that were also used by researchers years after his death.

Connelley served in other organizations. He was president of the Kansas Authors Club from Feb. 19, 1908, to Feb. 19, 1909, and he served in other officer capacities in that organization. He was president of the Mississippi Valley Historical Association (renamed the Organization of American Historians in 1965) from 1921 to 1922.

Legacy
Connelley left much material on various historical subjects. Most of his books and some of his research notes are located in the archives of the Kansas Historical Society in Topeka, Kansas. Much also exists in the Kansas City Kansas Public Library, since Connelley researched into the history of Wyandotte County, where Kansas City, Kansas, is located. Truman State University, in Kirksville, Missouri, contains material from a number of interviews Connelley conducted concerning William C. Quantrill's 1863 raid on Lawrence, Kansas. This raid is also known as the Lawrence massacre, since more than 180 men and boys (mostly defenseless) were killed by Quantrill's men. A collection of correspondence, research notes and photographs concerning Connelley is located in Lawrence, at the University of Kansas Kenneth Spencer Research Library. Another collection of documents written by Connelley and to Connelley is in the University of Oklahoma library system.

References

1855 births
1930 deaths
Writers from Kansas
People from Bonner Springs, Kansas
Schoolteachers from Kansas